Troides darsius, the Sri Lankan birdwing, is a species of birdwing butterfly found in Sri Lanka. It is the largest butterfly on the island and is also the national butterfly of Sri Lanka.

Among the largest and most gaudy of the Ceylon Lepidoptera is the great black and yellow butterfly (Ornithoptera darsius, Gray); the upper wings, of which measure six inches (15 cm) across, are of deep velvet black, the lower, ornamented by large particles of satiny yellow, through which the sunlight passes, and few insects can compare with it in beauty, as it hovers over the flowers of the heliotrope, which furnish the favourite food of the perfect fly, although the caterpillar feeds on the aristolochia and the betel leaf and suspends its chrysalis from its drooping tendrils.

Description 

From Troides helena cerberus it differs as follows:

Male forewing: adnervular pale streaks not prominent on the upperside, more distinctly marked on the underside. Hindwing black, with a very broad discal slightly curved silky-yellow band or patch that extends beyond the cell from interspaces 2 to 7, and is composed of elongate outwardly emarginate yellow markings that are divided only by the black veins. In most specimens the inner margin of this band crosses the apex of the cell, but in many the cell is entirely black. Abdomen with some black markings beneath and a lateral row of black spots.

Female: Differs from cerberus female in the much greater extent of the black on the hindwing. Interspace 1 with a pale dusky-white patch in the middle; interspace 7 with an inner and an outer yellow spot; cell entirely black or nearly so, sometimes, but rarely, with the yellow extended into the apex.

Wingspan of 165–175 mm.

Life cycle

Larva 
Cylindrical, dull purple brown, with two dorsal rows and anterior and lateral rows of fleshy tubercles, those on the eighth segment and a streak from its base to lower end of seventh segment being pale pink; between the tubercles are dark brown streaks. Feeds on Aristolochia (Moore.)

Pupa 
Pale purplish ochreous, bent backwards anteriorly; thorax conical, the top flattened and its sides angled; wing cases dilated and flattened laterally in the middle, their outer edge acute; two middle segments of abdomen with a dorsal pair of conical prominences. (Moore.)

Habitat 
The primary habitat is thinly wooded mountain forests from sea-level up to an elevation of 2,000 metres. Occasionally observed in gardens but generally rare in lowlands.

Threats 
Troides darsius is threatened by deforestation.

Related species 
Troides darsius is a member of the Troides haliphron species group. The members of this clade are:

Troides haliphron (Boisduval, 1836)
Troides darsius (Gray, [1853])
Troides vandepolli (Snellen, 1890)
Troides criton (C. & R. Felder, 1860)
Troides riedeli (Kirsch, 1885)
Troides plato (Wallace, 1865)
Troides staudingeri (Röber, 1888)

References 

D'Abrera, B. (1975) Birdwing Butterflies of the World. Country Life Books, London.
Haugum, J. & Low, A.M. 1978–1985. A Monograph of the Birdwing Butterflies. 2 volumes. Scandinavian Press, Klampenborg; 663 pp.
Kurt Rumbucher and Oliver Schäffler, 2004 Part 19, Papilionidae X. Troides III. in Erich Bauer and Thomas Frankenbach Eds. Butterflies of the World. Keltern: Goecke & Evers

External links 

Online guide to Butterflies of Sri Lanka Images of the adult and life stages, descriptions
Butterflycorner.net Images from Naturhistorisches Museum Wien (English/German)
ARKive Photos and more information
Nagypal
Sri Lanka Montane Rain Forests Ecoregion

Darsius
Butterflies of Asia
Butterflies described in 1852
Taxa named by George Robert Gray